Gregory Van Roten (born February 26, 1990) is an American football guard who is a free agent. He was originally signed by the Green Bay Packers as an undrafted free agent in 2012. He played college football at Penn.

Early years
Van Roten's football career started with the Baldwin Bombers youth football organization at the age of 11. He attended, and was an All-State Left Tackle at Chaminade High School in Mineola, New York from 2005 to 2008.

College career
Van Roten was an Ivy League All-Conference tackle at Pennsylvania from 2008 to 2012. While at the University of Pennsylvania, he studied at the Wharton School of Business and received his Bachelor of Science in Economics with a Concentration in Marketing. While at Penn, Van Roten was a member of the Delta Tau Delta Fraternity and the Student Athlete Advisory Committee.

Professional career

Green Bay Packers
Van Roten was signed by the Green Bay Packers on July 25, 2012. He played in ten games for the Packers from 2012 to 2013. He was released by the Packers on February 11, 2014.

Seattle Seahawks
He signed with the Seattle Seahawks on February 14, 2014, and was released by the team on August 27, 2014.

Toronto Argonauts
On May 22, 2015, Van Roten signed with the Toronto Argonauts of the Canadian Football League.

Jacksonville Jaguars
On February 27, 2017, Van Roten signed with the Jacksonville Jaguars. On May 1, 2017, he was released by the Jaguars.

Carolina Panthers
On July 25, 2017, Van Roten signed with the Carolina Panthers. He played in 10 games his first season in Carolina, primary on special teams, and served as a backup center and guard.

On January 29, 2018, Van Roten signed a two-year contract extension with the Panthers. He became a full-time starter in 2018, starting all 16 games at left guard. He was the only Panthers player to play every single offensive snap.

In 2019, Van Roten started the first 11 games at left guard before suffering a dislocated toe in Week 12. He was placed on injured reserve on November 27, 2019.

New York Jets
On April 2, 2020, Van Roten signed a three-year contract with the New York Jets. He started the first 12 games at right guard before being placed on injured reserve on December 12, 2020. On January 2, 2021, Van Roten was activated off of injured reserve.

On May 6, 2022, Van Roten was released by the Jets.

Buffalo Bills 
On June 13, 2022, the Buffalo Bills signed Van Roten to a one-year deal.

References

External links
Toronto Argonauts bio 

Official website

1990 births
Living people
American football offensive guards
American football offensive tackles
Buffalo Bills players
Carolina Panthers players
Green Bay Packers players
Jacksonville Jaguars players
New York Jets players
Penn Quakers football players
People from Rockville Centre, New York
Players of American football from New York (state)
Seattle Seahawks players
Sportspeople from Nassau County, New York
Chaminade High School alumni